The National Art Honor Society was established in 1978 in the United States by the National Art Education Association for high school students grades 9-12 from the National Art Honor Society.  The NAEA also offers a National Junior Art Honor Society for students in grades 6-8.

Its purpose is to assist student members to attain their highest potential in all forms of art, and to raise awareness of art education throughout the school and community.

Member students are eligible to apply to the Charles M. Robertson Memorial Scholarship, a special four-year scholarship to the Pratt Institute's School of Art and Design in New York.

Members and their school art program are eligible for several awards and grant programs, encouraged to submit articles and art work for publication in the NAHS News, published twice a year and is received by students as well as sponsors.  Students and their sponsors can attend the group's annual convention and receive professional publications for inclusion into the school's resource library.

References

External links 
 

1978 establishments in the United States
Visual arts education
High school honor societies
Art societies
Organizations established in 1978